Fredericksfield is a rural locality in the Shire of Burdekin, Queensland, Australia. In the  Fredericksfield had a population of 219 people.

Geography
The locality is bounded to the east by the North Coast railway line. There were a number of railway stations serving the locality but all are now abandoned:
 Berdaje railway station
 Keebah railway station
 Iyah railway station
 Koolkuna railway station

History 
Iyah State School opened on 6 September 1920. In 1945 there were complaints of overcrowding with 44 students enrolled and an average attendance of 38 students and only one teacher. The school closed on 31 December 1963. It was located at 13 Charlies Hill Road.

In the  Fredericksfield had a population of 219 people.

References 

Shire of Burdekin
Localities in Queensland